The following is a list of waterfalls in Sri Lanka.

See also 
 List of rivers in Sri Lanka
 List of waterfalls

Notes

References 
 

Waterfalls
Sri Lanka
Waterfalls